The 1897 Red River flood took place in April 1897, along the Red River resulting in significant damage to the city of Fargo, North Dakota. The conditions which led to the flood of 1897 were similar to the conditions behind the 2009 flood, however the 1897 flood was different in terms of the human response to it.

Until the 2009 flood, the 1897 flood was the highest water recorded in the Fargo-Moorhead area and has since served as the benchmark for which many other floods of the Red River were measured against.

Causes
Due to the level of measured snowfall a flood in the spring was expected.

River crests

External links
 Photographs of Flooding in the Fargo–Moorhead Region: 1897–1996
 Red River’s last record crest – 1897

References

Floods in the United States
Red River flood, 1897
Natural disasters in North Dakota
Red_River_flood, 1897
Red_River_flood, 1897
Red River floods